The Tiburtine Sibyl or Albunea was a Roman sibyl, whose seat was the ancient Etruscan town of Tibur (modern Tivoli).

The mythic meeting of Cæsar Augustus with the Sibyl, of whom he inquired whether he should be worshiped as a god, was often depicted by artists from the late Middle Ages onwards. In the versions known to the later Middle Ages, for example the account in the Golden Legend, Augustus asked the Sibyl whether he should be worshipped as a god, as the Roman Senate had ordered. She replied by showing him a vision of a young woman with a baby boy, high in the sky, while a voice from the heavens said "This is the virgin who shall conceive the saviour of the world", who would eclipse all the Roman gods. The episode was regarded as a prefiguration of the Biblical Magi's visit to the new-born Jesus and connected Ancient and Christian Rome, implying foreknowledge of the coming of Christ by the greatest of Roman emperors.

Whether the sibyl in question was the Etruscan Sibyl of Tibur or the Greek Sibyl of Cumæ is not always clear. The Christian author Lactantius identified the sibyl in question as the Tiburtine sibyl. He gave a circumstantial account of the pagan sibyls that is useful mostly as a guide to their identifications, as seen by 4th-century Christians:

The prophecy of the Tiburtine Sibyl

An apocalyptic pseudo-prophecy exists among the Sibylline Oracles, which was attributed to the Tiburtine Sibyl. Its earliest version may date from the fourth century, but in the form that it survives today it was written in the early eleventh century, and has been influenced by the Apocalypse of Pseudo-Methodius. Its first version in Latin dates from the tenth century and may have come from Lombardy, though it was quickly picked up (and rewritten) by the Salian dynasty and the Hohenstaufens. It proved a useful rhetorical tool, valuable for many a ruler; the lists it contained of emperors and kings were revised to fit the circumstances, and hundreds of versions remain from the Middle Ages.

Its conclusion purports to prophesy the advent in the world's ninth age of a final Emperor vanquishing the foes of Christianity (heavily dependent on the Apocalypse of Pseudo-Methodius):

This Emperor's reign is characterized by great wealth, victory over the foes of Christianity, an end of paganism and the conversion of the Jews. The Emperor having vanquished Gog and Magog, 

In doing so, he will give way to the Antichrist:

The prophecy relates that Antichrist would be opposed by the Two Witnesses from the Book of Revelation, identified with Elijah and Enoch; after having killed the witnesses and started a final persecution of the Christians,

Frescoes at the Villa d'Este
Ippolito II d'Este rebuilt the Villa d'Este at Tibur, the modern Tivoli, from 1550 onward, and commissioned elaborate fresco murals in the Villa that celebrate the Tiburtine Sibyl, as prophesying the birth of Christ to the classical world.

Gallery

See also

 Arabic Sibylline prophecy
 Apocalypse of Pseudo-Methodius
 Temple of the Sibyl

Notes

References
Hall, James, Hall's Dictionary of Subjects and Symbols in Art, 1996 (2nd edn.), John Murray, 
Murray, Peter and Linda, revised Tom Devonshire Jones, The Oxford Dictionary of Christian Art & Architecture, 2014, Oxford University Press, 0199695105
Reyniers, Jeroen, 'The Iconography of Emperor Augustus with the Tiburtine Sibyl in the Low Countries. An Overview', in: M. Cavalieri, D. Engels, P. Assenmaker, M. Cavagna (ed.), Augustus Through the Ages: Receptions, Readings and Appropriations of the Historical Figure of the First Roman Emperor, Collection Latomus, Brussels, 2021.
Fischer, Jens, 'Folia ventis turbata – Sibyllinische Orakel und der Gott Apollon zwischen später Republik und augusteischem Principat (Studien zur Alten Geschichte 33)', Göttingen 2022

External links
The Pseudo-Tiburtine prophecy, dated ca 380, with additions (e-text)
Review of the book Nel segno della Sibilla Tiburtina

Ancient Roman religion
Sibyls
Cultural depictions of Augustus